This is a list of magazines published in the Gujarati language of India.

List 

 Buddhiprakash
 Chetana
 Chitralekha
 Dalitchetna
 Dhabak
 Doot
 Gazalvishwa
 Gujarati (1880–1929)
 Jnanasudha
 Kavilok
 Kaumudi (1924–1937)
 Kumar
 Parivesh
 Priyamvada (1885–1890)
 Ruchi
 Safari
 Satyaprakash
 Shabdasrishti
 Stribodh
 Sudarshan 
  Vismi Sadi (magazine) (1916 - 1920) 
 Vasant'' (1902–1939)
   [Urmi Navarachna]
   [baljivan]

See also
 Media in Gujarati language
 List of magazines in India
 Media of India

References

Gujarati-language magazines
Gujarti
Gujarati